Katherine Irma Mayfair is a fictional character created by Marc Cherry for the ABC television series Desperate Housewives. The character was portrayed by Dana Delany and first appeared in the series' fourth season premiere on September 30, 2007, as the focus of the yearly mystery.

Katherine is generally characterized by her cold demeanor and impressive domestic skills. Though initially a homemaker, Katherine started a catering business with neighbor Bree Van de Kamp (Marcia Cross), with whom she shares "a heated rivalry." She has been married twice, to Wayne Davis (Gary Cole) and Adam Mayfair (Nathan Fillion), but both relationships ended in divorce. Katherine has had two children; Dylan Davis (Hailee Denham), her daughter who died as a young child, and Dylan Mayfair (Lyndsy Fonseca), her adoptive daughter. The character was later paired with Mike Delfino (James Denton) in the fifth season, which later ended when he returned to and remarried Susan Mayer (Teri Hatcher), leading to Katherine's nervous breakdown in the sixth season. Later that season saw Katherine written into the series' first lesbian relationship with Robin Gallagher (Julie Benz). Delany left the series soon thereafter, when the character relocated to Paris indefinitely with Robin. Delany returned for a guest appearance during the series finale of Desperate Housewives in 2012.

Delany's portrayal received praise from critics and audiences, with many critics attributing the improved quality of the series' fourth season to Delany's performance. The actress was a critics' favorite for a Primetime Emmy Award nomination for Outstanding Supporting Actress in a Comedy Series in 2008.

Development and casting
Delany auditioned for the series' pilot episode in 2004 for the role of Bree Van de Kamp. Creator Marc Cherry thought she delivered "a fantastic audition." Delany was offered the role but rejected it three times. Delany has since insisted that she was not ready to do another television series at the time and that the character of Bree was too similar to her character on Pasadena. The role eventually went to Marcia Cross, Cherry's second choice. Delany reportedly regretted not accepting the part.

When Cherry was developing Katherine, a character with "a lot of Alpha female qualities and some slyness and darkness," he offered Delany the role. She accepted the role and remained on the series until the end of the sixth season. Following her multi-episode guest role on another ABC series, Castle, network executives offered Delany the lead in a new pilot for the 2010-2011 television season. Delany filmed the pilot for Body of Proof in April 2010; her absence in Desperate Housewives was explained by having Katherine and her girlfriend, Robin Gallagher (Julie Benz), leave town indefinitely. In May, ABC picked up Body of Proof for thirteen episodes; thus, Delany did not return for the seventh season of Desperate Housewives as a series regular. Delany admitted that her exit from the series was quick, but insisted that she may return to the series at some point, regardless of whether or not her new series is successful. She returned during the series finale in 2012.

Personality
When Katherine was introduced to the series, many critics noted that she was very similar to Bree Hodge (Marcia Cross), in that both prided themselves on their domestic skills. Cherry noted that Katherine "was clearly different" before her arrival in the fourth season, which Susan confirms when she claims Katherine is "not as fun as she used to be." Her cold exterior is noted by many characters, including Gabrielle Solis (Eva Longoria Parker), who remarks that Katherine is "smug and 'holier than thou'" and is "getting a reputation around [the neighbourhood] for having a stick up [her] ass!" Though Katherine immediately conflicts with the other women on the street, most notably Bree, she eventually develops close friendships with her neighbours. Nevertheless, her rivalry with Bree continues but as a natural part of their sisterly relationship. In the sixth season, however, Katherine "[morphs] into the person the housewives have to hate" in the absence of Edie Britt (Nicollette Sheridan).<ref name="sfgate">Martin, Denise (November 11, 2009). [http://articles.sfgate.com/2009-11-11/entertainment/17179074_1_nurse-colleen-mcmurphy-desperate-housewives-katherine-mayfair "Dana Delany turned down 'Sex,' got Desperate'"]. San Francisco Chronicle. Retrieved June 25, 2010.</ref>

Katherine appears to be dependent on a romantic partner. Her first husband, Wayne, was abusive but she eventually left him and married Adam Mayfair. When he leaves, she tries convincing him to come home, saying that she is "lonely," despite having discovered that he had an affair. Later, in the fifth season, Katherine contemplates leaving Fairview because she is single, later revisiting the option in an attempt to force Mike to realize he loves her. She also resorts to trickery in order to ensure that Mike does not end their engagement."Marry Me a Little". Larry Shaw (director), Jason Ganzel (writer). Desperate Housewives. ABC. May 10, 2009. Season 5, no. 22. When Mike leaves Katherine for Susan, she suffers a complete nervous breakdown. When she becomes romantically involved with a woman, she puts her life in Fairview on hold indefinitely while trying to evaluate everything during an extended vacation in Paris.

History

Past
Katherine was born on September 8, 1963 and married to abusive police officer Wayne Davis (Gary Cole). Together, they had a daughter named Dylan (Hailee Denham). Wayne became increasingly violent, forcing Katherine to flee with Dylan, and seek refuge with her aunt, Lillian Simms (Ellen Geer). While living in Fairview, 4356 Wisteria Lane, Katherine befriended her neighbours, Mary Alice Young and Susan Mayer."Smiles of a Summer Night", David Grossman (director), Bob Daily (writer), Matt Berry (director). Desperate Housewives. ABC. October 7, 2007. Season 4, no. 2. but she didn't meet Bree Van de Kamp, although she moved to the house next door, in the same year. One year later, Katherine returned from a walk with Lilian and she found out that Wayne had visited Dylan while Mary Alice babysat her and gave her a new doll. Katherine put the doll on top of a heavy oak dresser and got into a fight with Wayne, hitting him with a candlestick. After Wayne left, Katherine discovers Dylan had tried to retrieve her doll and died when the dresser fell over and crushed her. Fearing Wayne’s wrath, Katherine and Lillian buried Dylan in nearby woods and she left Wisteria Lane, lying Susan and Mary Alice that she had taken a job offer in Chicago.

Katherine adopted a girl very similar to Dylan from a Romanian orphanage. Katherine began raising her new daughter, Dylan (Lyndsy Fonseca), and they moved to Chicago. Later Katherine married gynecologist Adam Mayfair (Nathan Fillion) from Harvard. Katherine lied to Adam that Wayne killed her biological daughter; he agreed to keep her secret and protect them from her ex-husband. After short affair between Adam and Sylvia Greene (Melora Walters), which took all their savings and friends from them in Chicago, the Mayfairs moved to Wisteria Lane, Fairview to care for Lillian, now terminally ill, and escape the humiliation of Adam's alleged sexual harassment.

Season 4
Twelve years after leaving Wisteria Lane, Katherine, Adam and Dylan move into Lillian's house. Susan introduces Katherine to Bree, Lynette and Gabrielle, her friends and neighbours; Katherine immediately clashes with each of them, particularly Bree. Meanwhile, Dylan doesn't remember living on Wisteria Lane. Katherine begins integrating herself into Susan's circle of friends but continues to conflict with Bree, Gabrielle and Lynette. Katherine's mysterious and cold exterior and Dylan’s lack of memories about life on Wisteria Lane raise the suspicions of their neighbors. Dylan questions Katherine about her birth father but Katherine only says that he is too dangerous to let back into their lives.

Lillian moves into the Mayfairs' guest bedroom and writes a detailed account of the original Dylan’s death in a note addressed to the current Dylan, but dies before she can give it to her. Sylvia Greene (Melora Walters), the woman who accused Adam of sexual harassment in Chicago, visits him, hoping to rekindle their romance. Katherine thinks Sylvia's accusations are false but Adam admits having had an affair with her, which is why he settled out of court and they "lost everything" in Chicago. Katherine kicks Adam out of the house. While packing, he finds Lillian's note and leaves after confronting Katherine about her lies and she throws the note in the fire. However, Dylan salvages a few pieces and deduces that Katherine killed Wayne. She calls Adam for more answers but he calls Katherine. He promises to give her one last alibi and lie to Dylan but their marriage is still over.

Katherine and Bree finally put aside their rivalry to start a catering business. Meanwhile, Wayne finds out about Dylan when he sees a photograph of her, Katherine, Bree, and Julie posing at the Founders Ball. He tracks down Dylan and the two start meeting in private; eventually, she reintroduces the two. Hoping to drive Wayne away, Katherine tells him that Dylan is not his daughter, something Wayne confirms when he conducts a DNA test and also notices that Dylan lacks a scar on her right arm that the original Dylan sustained in a bike accident. Adam learns that Wayne has located Katherine and Dylan and offers to help them escape, deciding to take Dylan on a graduation trip and never return but Wayne kidnaps Adam. Fearing Wayne has killed Adam, Katherine begs Dylan to leave immediately but Dylan demands the entire truth. Katherine tells her, prompting Dylan to walk out. Later, Wayne corners Katherine and takes her hostage. Before he can shoot her, Adam arrives. Knowing Wayne will always track her, Katherine shoots him dead. Bree, Susan, Lynette, and Gabrielle tell the police that her actions were in self-defense and Katherine is finally integrated into their social group. Dylan returns and reunites with her mother.

Five-year jump
Bree and Katherine open up their catering company and Katherine is the head chef. Katherine is jealous that Bree is taking credit for some stuff that is not hers.

Season 5
During the five years between seasons four and five, Katherine remains on Wisteria Lane.  Katherine briefly moves in with Bree, a recovering alcoholic who relapses when her husband, Orson Hodge (Kyle MacLachlan), leaves for jail. Katherine's rivalry with Bree continues despite their shared business. Katherine is unhappy when she realizes that Bree has used her recipes in her cookbook and leaves her to run the business while she publicizes it. Her resentment deepens when Bree hires Orson as an employee. Yearning for romance, Katherine secretly begins dating Mike Delfino (James Denton), Susan's ex-husband. Eventually, Susan finds out about the relationship and feels betrayed. She eventually gives them her blessing but is uncomfortable with their relationship.

Katherine begins spending more time with Susan and Mike's son, M.J. (Mason Vale Cotton) and move in together. Susan tells Mike and Katherine that she's marrying Jackson but is horrified to learn that Mike will no longer have to pay her alimony. Katherine deceives Susan by letting her think Mike will pay alimony regardless. When Susan wants to thank Mike herself, Katherine admits to not telling him that Susan's engagement to Jackson isn't real, afraid that he would leave her for Susan. The couple elope to Las Vegas, but Mike leaves Katherine at the airport when he learns that their neighbor, Dave Williams (Neal McDonough), plans to kill M.J. in revenge for the deaths of his wife Lila and daughter Paige in a car accident. M.J. escapes unharmed and Mike and Susan share a passionate kiss following the ordeal.

Season 6
In the sixth season premiere, Mike breaks up with Katherine and decides to re-marry Susan. Katherine does not take this very well. When Susan's wedding dress is delivered to Katherine's house, due to Susan being out at the time, Katherine deliberately wears it while cooking to annoy her. She also demands that Susan publicly apologize to her for taking Mike away. Susan initially refuses and locks her in a closet, Katherine then breaks free and crashes the wedding. Susan then apologizes, but Katherine's feelings remain bitter. When Julie is attacked and rendered comatose, Katherine visits Mike while Susan is away at the hospital, gives him a kiss and tells him she'll be there for him. Katherine then tells Orson that Mike made a pass at her, hoping this will get back to Susan. Bree becomes concerned when she sees Katherine spying through Susan and Mike's windows one night. After Katherine throws a fit over Bree using one of her cake designs at a wedding they are catering, Bree fires her and advises her to seek professional help. Furious, Katherine keys Bree's car.

Katherine's rivalry with Susan intensifies as she continues pursuing Mike. Things come to a head at a neighborhood watch meeting after Susan ignores Katherine when she tries to volunteer, escalating into Susan publicly threatening Katherine if she doesn't leave her and Mike alone, and a subsequent incident where Susan panics and accidentally shoots Katherine in the shoulder with a gun that Angie Bolen's son Danny had loaned to Julie, after Katherine once again tries spying on Susan through her windows. Realizing the danger Katherine poses, Susan begins suspecting Katherine attacked Julie out of revenge. Though Katherine has an alibi, Susan and Mike's fears about Katherine are soon realized. When Mike hears that Katherine has told M.J. that Susan is a bad mother, he coldly tells her off and warns her to stay away from M.J. or else incur his wrath. When he leaves, Katherine stabs herself in the stomach with a knife that has Mike's fingerprints on it. Katherine frames Mike and he is temporarily sent to jail while she is in the hospital. Susan worries that Katherine has suffered a nervous breakdown and asks Dylan to visit and have her mother committed for psychiatric observation. She then learns that Katherine has been telling Dylan that she, not Susan, was married to Mike. When Katherine realizes she's been caught, she has a complete breakdown and is institutionalized.
 
Several months later, when Katherine returns to Wisteria Lane, she develops a friendship with Robin Gallagher (Julie Benz), a former stripper who moves in with Susan and Mike. In order to preserve her friendship with Susan, Robin moves in with Katherine. Katherine is surprised to learn that Robin is a lesbian and begins to develop a physical attraction to her, as well as an emotional connection. Katherine is very confused by these new feelings. Soon, the two become sexually involved. When their relationship is made public, Katherine decides that she cares too much about what others think and suggests that she and Robin take a vacation in Paris while they work on defining their relationship. Robin agrees and the two leave town that night.

Season 8
Katherine returns to the series in the final episode "Finishing the Hat". Katherine has made a huge wad of cash as the owner of a frozen food company in France. She returns to Wisteria Lane to offer Lynette Scavo a job as the head of her United States expansion. It is revealed she and Robin broke up three months after arriving in Paris as Katherine decided she would rather focus on her professional life.

Reception

Critical
Katherine's arrival to the series in the fourth season received positive reviews. Robert Bianco of USA Today praised Delany's portrayal of the character, noting that the season was "shaping up to be the best since the first" due to Delany's performance. Other critics agreed that Delany's performance helped the series return to the quality of its first season. Tim Stack of Entertainment Weekly confessed that while he is not a fan of Delany's acting, she is "perfect for this role and looks to be a choice adversary for Bree." He also praised the set-up for their mystery storyline. Matt Roush of TV Guide'' complimented the addition of Katherine, writing "while she's obviously harboring a dark secret, at least there's no one trapped in the basement," referencing the Betty Applewhite (Alfre Woodard) storyline from the second season.

Awards
Following the 2007-2008 television season, Delany was a promising contender for an Emmy Award in the Outstanding Supporting Actress in a Comedy Series category, though she did not receive a nomination. In 2009, Delany received a Prism Award for Best Performance in a Comedy Series.

References

External links 

Desperate Housewives characters
Fictional bisexual females
Television characters introduced in 2007
Fictional chefs
Fictional housewives
Fictional mariticides